Jian (also Romanized as Jīān and Jīyān) is a village in Beyza Rural District, Beyza District, Sepidan County, Fars Province, Iran. At the 2006 census, its population was 2,107, in 444 families.

References 

Populated places in Beyza County